Rusty may refer to something covered with rust or with a rust (color). Rusty is also a nickname for people who have red hair, have a rust-hued skin tone, or have the given name Russell.

Rusty may also refer to:

People
Rusty Anderson (born 1959), American guitarist
Rusty Areias (born 1949), American politician
Rusty Bryant (1929–1991), American saxophonist
Rusty Cooley (born 1970), American guitarist
Rusty Crawford (1885–1971), Canadian ice hockey player
Rusty Cundieff (born 1960), American actor and director
Rusty Day (1945–1982), American musician
Rusty Dedrick (1918–2009), American trumpeter
Rusty DeWees (born 1960), American actor and comedian
Rusty Draper (1923–2003), American singer 
Rusty Duke, American judge
Rusty Edwards (born 1955), American hymn writer and minister
Rusty Egan (born 1957), British drummer
Rusty Fein (born 1982), American figure skater
Rusty Frank, American dancer, choreographer, and historian
Rusty Fricke (born 1964), American arena football player
Rusty Gerhardt (born 1950), American baseball pitcher
Rusty Glover (born 1966), American politician
Rusty Goffe (born 1948), British dwarf entertainer
Rusty Goodman (1933–1990), American gospel singer and songwriter
Rusty Greer (born 1969), American baseball player
Rusty Hamer (1947–1990), American actor 
Rusty Hardin (born 1941), American lawyer
Rusty Harrison (born 1981), Australian speedway rider
Rusty Hevelin (1922–2011), American science fiction fan
Rusty Higgins, American saxophonist
Rusty Hilger (1962–2019), American football player
Rusty Hopkinson, Australian rock musician
Rusty Humphries (born 1965), American radio host
Rusty Jackson (born 1950), American football player
Rusty Jacobs (born 1967), American actor
Rusty Jeffers (born 1964), American bodybuilder
Rusty Joiner (born 1972), American model
Rusty Jones (disambiguation), multiple people
Rusty Keaulana (born 1966), American surfer
Rusty Kidd (born 1946), American politician
Rusty Kruger (born 1975), Canadian lacrosse player
Rusty Kuntz (born 1955), American baseball player
Rusty LaRue (born 1973), American basketball player and coach
Rusty Lemorande (born 1954), American screenwriter and film producer
Rusty Lisch (born 1956), American football quarterback
Rusty Long, American surfer, writer, and photographer
Rusty Magee (1955–2003), American composer 
Rusty Mae Moore (1941-2022), American activist and educator
Rusty Meacham (born 1968), American baseball pitcher
Rusty Morrison (born 1956), American poet and publisher
Rusty Nails (filmmaker) (born 1966), American filmmaker and musician
Rusty Page (1908–1985), New Zealand rugby union player
Rusty Paul, American politician 
Rusty Pierce (born 1979), American soccer player
Rusty Robertson (1927–1989), New Zealand rowing coach
Rusty Russell (disambiguation), multiple people
Philip Rastelli (1918–1991), American mobster, boss of the Bonanno crime family
Rusty Schweickart (born 1935), American astronaut, engineer, scientist and business executive
Rusty Schwimmer (born 1962), American actress and singer
Rusty Smith (disambiguation), multiple people
Rusty Staub (1944–2018), American baseball player 
Rusty Theron (born 1985), South African cricketer
Rusty Torres (born 1948), Puerto Rican baseball player
Rusty Troy (born 1966), American soccer player
Rusty Wallace (born 1956), American race car driver
Rusty Warren (1930–2021), American comedian and singer
Rusty Young (disambiguation), multiple people

Arts and entertainment

Fictional characters
Rusty, a sidekick of Big Guy from The Big Guy and Rusty the Boy Robot, a 1995 comic book
"Rusty", the Good Dalek, in the Doctor Who episode "Into the Dalek"
Rusty, a locomotive in the British children's book series The Railway Series and television series Thomas & Friends
Rusty the Steam Engine, in the musical Starlight Express
 Russell "Rusty" Beck, in the American television series Major Crimes
Rusty Brown, an American comic strip by Chris Ware
Rusty Collins, a Marvel Comics character
Finbarr "Rusty" Galloway, Cole Phelps' partner at the homicide desk in the video game L.A. Noire
Russell "Rusty" Griswold, in the National Lampoon's Vacation films 
Rusty Riley, an American newspaper comic strip
Rusty Rivets, a Canadian television series 
Rusty Rodriguez, in the 1984 film Footloose
Rusty Ryan (character), in the 2001 film Ocean's Eleven and its sequels
Rusty Shackleford, the often-used alias of Dale Gribble from the television series King of the Hill
Doctor Thaddeus Venture, nicknamed "Rusty", in the television series The Venture Bros.
Corporal Rusty "B Company" fictional character in The Adventures of Rin Tin Tin television series, portrayed by Lee Aaker

Music
Rusty (band), a Canadian alternative rock band in the 1990s
Rusty (Rodan album), a 1994 indie rock album by Rodan
Rusty (Slick Shoes album), a 1997 pop punk album by Slick Shoes
"Rusty", a song from the album Wolf by Tyler, the Creator

Other arts and entertainment
Rusty (film series), 1940s children's film series featuring a German Shepherd dog named Rusty
Rusty (video game), 1993 action video game

Sports
Rusty Australia, a surfboard and surfwear brand

Lists of people by nickname